The men's underwater hockey tournament for 4x4 sides at the 2019 Southeast Asian Games was held at the Vermosa Sports Hub in Imus, Cavite, Philippines.

Results
All times are Philippine Standard Time (UTC+08:00)

Round-robin

Knockout round

Semifinals

Bronze medal match

Gold medal match

Final standings

See also
Women's 4x4 tournament

References

External links
  

men 4x4